Amanda Harkimo (born 30 November 1990) is a Finnish DJ and reality TV star.

Early life 
Harkimo was born in Sipoo, Finland, to Roy Juhani Harkimo and Johanna Ranne.

Career

As a DJ 
Harkimo is the official DJ for the Finnish KHL team Helsingin Jokerit, Finland men's national ice hockey team and Finland national basketball team. She played music at the IIHF World U20 Championship, Ice Hockey World Championships, IIHF World Women's Championships and European Basketball Championship. Harkimo started as a club DJ in 2012, and after played in several clubs; Finland, Sweden, Turkey, Spain, Estonia, Thailand and Malta. In 2013, she was the opening act for David Guetta at Weekend Festival in Helsinki.

As a reality TV star 
Harkimo participated in many reality shows in Finland and one in Sweden. Her first TV show was Big Brother Finland where she spent 39 days. In 2015, she participated in one of Sweden's most watched TV shows, Paradise Hotel, and in 2018, she was a temptation on Temptation Island Suomi. She participated in Julkkisselviytyjät and Tuurin kyläkauppias ja kesäapulaiset. In 2016, Harkimo created her own TV show called Amanda ja pelimiehet where she traveled to Russia and North America to meet and interview KHL and NHL ice hockey players about their life and career.

Personal life 
Harkimo's notable relatives include businessman and politician Hjallis Harkimo who is her paternal uncle, and cinematographer Osmo Harkimo who is her paternal grandfather. Through her paternal grandmother she is also a descendant of German-born  who founded the Finnish cutlery and cookware company Hackman in 1790. According to a DNA test she took, Harkimo is also 15.7% of Irish, Scottish and Welsh descent.

References 

1990 births
Living people
Club DJs
Women DJs
Finnish DJs
Finnish women musicians
Finnish people of German descent
Finnish people of Irish descent
Finnish people of Scottish descent
Finnish television personalities
Participants in Swedish reality television series
People from Sipoo
Reality television participants
Women television personalities
Finnish people of Welsh descent